The Amos Cook House is an historic house in Scituate, Rhode Island.  Built in 1812, it is a -story wood-frame structure, five bays wide, with a large central chimney.  The center entry is framed by a Greek Revival surround that was a later alteration, and there is a shed-roof porch extending along the southern (left) facade.  The house has retained much of its interior woodwork.  The house was built by Augustus and Carver Hopkins, members of Rhode Island's prominent Hopkins family.  It was purchased, along with a number of farm outbuildings, by Amos Cook in 1865, and was converted into a summer residence in the early 20th century.

The house was listed on the National Register of Historic Places in 1979.

See also
National Register of Historic Places listings in Providence County, Rhode Island

References

Houses on the National Register of Historic Places in Rhode Island
Federal architecture in Rhode Island
Houses completed in 1812
Houses in Providence County, Rhode Island
Buildings and structures in Scituate, Rhode Island
National Register of Historic Places in Providence County, Rhode Island